The Transgender Day of Remembrance (TDoR), also known as the International Transgender Day of Remembrance, has been observed annually (from its inception) on November 20 as a day to memorialize those who have been murdered as a result of transphobia. The day was founded to draw attention to the continued violence directed towards transgender people.

Transgender Day of Remembrance was founded in 1999 by a small group, including Gwendolyn Ann Smith, Nancy Nangeroni, and Jahaira DeAlto, to memorialize the murder of transgender woman Rita Hester in Allston, Massachusetts. In 2010, TDoR was observed in over 185 cities throughout more than 20 countries.

Typically, a TDoR memorial includes a reading of the names of those who died from October 1st of the former year to September 30th of the current year, and may include other actions, such as candlelight vigils, dedicated church services, marches, art shows, food drives and film screenings. GLAAD (formerly the Gay & Lesbian Alliance Against Defamation) has extensively covered TDoR, interviewed numerous transgender advocates (including actress Candis Cayne), profiled an event at the New York City LGBT Community Center and discussed media coverage of TDoR.

History
Rita Hester (November 30, 1963 – November 28, 1998) was a transgender African-American woman who was murdered in Allston, Massachusetts, on November 28, 1998. In response to her murder, an outpouring of grief and anger led to a candlelight vigil held the following Friday (December 4) in which about 250 people participated. The community struggle to see Rita's life and identity covered respectfully by local papers, including the Boston Herald and Bay Windows, was chronicled by Nancy Nangeroni. Her death inspired the "Remembering Our Dead" web project and the Transgender Day of Remembrance (TDoR).

Reception 

While TDoR is a critical event, scholars and activists committed to advancing intersectional approaches to trans politics continue to highlight the importance of seeing transphobic violence as inherently connected to race, gender, and class. This is reflected in the disproportionate instances of violence against trans women of color in general, Black and Latina transgender women in particular.

Theorists C. Riley Snorton and Jin Haritaworn critique how images and narratives centering on the deaths of trans people of color—most often transfeminine bodies of color—are circulated within social movements and spaces headed by white gay and trans activists, such as TDoR. Reflecting on the case of African American trans woman Tyra Hunter, Snorton and Haritaworn observe the dangers of positioning trans women and transfeminine bodies of color as legible only in the aftermath of their deaths, and failing to see such violence as effects of both systematic transphobia and racism. Resonating alongside (but not limited to) trans activists CeCe McDonald, Reina Gossett, Sylvia Rivera, and Dean Spade, Snorton and Haritaworn's work advocates for the importance of an intersectional approach to events such as TDoR and transgender activism in general.

Scholar Sarah Lamble argues that TDoR's focus on a collective mourning risks producing the white spectator as innocent of, rather than complicit in, the violence that produces the deaths of trans women of color they are mourning. Lamble states that:

{{quote|Our task then is to push these further—not only with respect to TDOR but also in the many ways we recount and confront violence. None of us are innocent. We must envision practices of remembrance that situate our own positions within structures of power that authorize violence in the first place. Our task is to move from sympathy to responsibility, from complicity to reflexivity, from witnessing to action. It is not enough to simply honor the memory of the dead—we must transform the practices of the living.|Lamble, 2008: Retelling racialized violence, remaking white innocence: The politics of interlocking oppressions in Transgender Day of Remembrance'''}}

Transgender activist Mirha-Soleil Ross criticizes TDoR for conflating the motivation behind the murders of transgender women sex workers. In an interview with scholar Viviane Namaste, she presents examples of transgender sex workers who were murdered in Toronto for being sex workers and accuses the organizers of TDoR of using these women who died for being sex workers as martyrs of the transgender community.

Recognition by governments

 Canada 
The Canadian province of Ontario unanimously passed the Trans Day of Remembrance Act, 2017 on December 12, 2017, officially recognizing TDoR and requiring the Legislative Assembly of Ontario to hold a minute of silence every year on November 20.

 United States 
In 2020, US president-elect Joe Biden recognized the Transgender Day of Remembrance and said the transphobic violence experienced by trans women is intolerable. In 2021, Joe Biden and Kamala Harris issued a statement saying, "At least 46 transgender Americans were killed by acts of fatal violence to date this year". His office also issued a report outlining "How the Biden-Harris Administration Is Advancing Safety, Opportunity, and Inclusion for Transgender and Gender Diverse Individuals." Moreover, Biden called on the Senate to pass the Equality Act.

Antony J. Blinken, United States Secretary of State, also issued a statement mourning the loss of trans lives in 2021. As the chief American diplomat, he stated, "Promoting and protecting the human rights of LGBTQI+ persons is a foreign policy priority of this Administration."

On November 18, 2021, on the House floor, Representative Ayanna Pressley read the names of 46 trans people murdered that year. Pressley was joined by other members of the Congressional LGBTQ Equality Caucus that included Representatives Marie Newman, David N. Cicilline, Mark Takano, Sara Jacobs, and Al Green.

See also

 Day of Silence
 Hate crime
 History of transgender people in the United States
 International Transgender Day of Visibility
 List of transgender-rights organizations
 List of people killed for being transgender
 Trans bashing
 Trans Day of Action
 Transgender rights movement

References

External links

 Smith, Gwendolyn Ann. "Transgender Day of Remembrance: Rita Hester and Beyond", Huffington Post'', 2013-11-20.
 International Transgender Day of Remembrance at GLAAD
 Transgender Day Of Remembrance – Manchester, UK

Violence against LGBT people
Civil awareness days
Transgender events
November observances
Recurring events established in 1999
International observances
Articles containing video clips
LGBT-related observances